Caste is a system of social stratification and hierarchy in human societies. It may also refer to:
Caste system in India
Caste: The Origins of Our Discontents, a 2020 book by Isabel Wilkerson
 Caste (play), a play by Thomas William Robertson
Caste (1930 film), a British film
Caste (upcoming film), an American drama film
Caste (biology), a group in eusocial animals

See also
Half-caste